Miskin Manor is a Victorian manor house built in 1864 in a Tudor style, situated in the village of Miskin in Rhondda Cynon Taf, south Wales. The estate was owned by the Williams family including Rhys Rhys-Williams for many years who were descended from the Welsh bard David Williams. Today, the manor is used as a hotel and venue for wedding receptions. It was once filmed for the Doctor Who series 5 finale The Big Bang.

The manor is a Grade II listed building. The gardens and park attached to the house are designated Grade II on the Cadw/ICOMOS Register of Parks and Gardens of Special Historic Interest in Wales.

Gallery

References

External links

Hotels in Wales
Manor houses in Wales
Tourist attractions in Rhondda Cynon Taf
Country houses in Wales
Buildings and structures in Rhondda Cynon Taf
Houses completed in 1864
Registered historic parks and gardens in Rhondda Cynon Taf